Khichuqaqa (Quechua khichu a piece of a whole, fraction, qaqa rock, also spelled K'echuqaqa) is an archaeological site in Peru with rock paintings and tombs nearby. It is situated in the Cusco Region, Urubamba Province, Urubamba District.

References 

Rock art in South America
Archaeological sites in Peru
Archaeological sites in Cusco Region
Tombs in Peru